Alin Tudor Adi Stoica (born 10 December 1979) is a Romanian former professional footballer who played as an attacking midfielder. He has been called "one of the greatest, if not the greatest talent" in Belgian football in the late 1990s and early 2000s. In 2003 Gheorghe Hagi named Stoica his potential successor.

Having come through the youth ranks at Steaua București, the biggest club in Romania, he made his senior and professional debut in 1995 at the age of 16. He moved to Belgian club R.S.C. Anderlecht a year later and went on to win three Belgian First Division titles in his six-year stay at the Belgium club. Ahead of the 2002–03 season, he moved to rivals Club Brugge where he won one league title before leaving in 2004 in his mid-20s. Following a two-year spell at Belgian club Gent from 2006 to 2008, he had various stints in Italy, Romania and Serbia but did not settle with any team until his retirement in 2015.

Club career
Stoica joined the Steaua București youth team at the age of six and made his professional debut for Steaua in 1995 at the age of 16. He spent one season at the Romanian champions before moving to the most successful club in Belgium R.S.C. Anderlecht for a transfer fee of €1.2 million in 1996.

He quickly became a fan favorite, being nicknamed "Le Petit Prince du Parc Astrid", and helped the Club to win five titles from 1999 to 2001.
In the 2000–01 season he scored four goals, against Real Madrid, Lazio, Leeds United and Dynamo Kyiv, becoming the only Romanian player to achieve this feat in one Champions League season. With 44 games and 13 goals in the 2000–01 season he won the Young Football of the Year award.

In his last year of contract, after he was on the transfer list of several big European Clubs, his negotiations with chairman Roger Vanden Stock for a new contract with a huge salary raise did not conclude and Stoica left Anderlecht to sign with league rivals Club Brugge KV, just before the beginning of the 2002–03 campaign. With 19 matches and five goals he helped Brugge clinch the league title in his debut season. After two seasons and four trophies he left the Club and signed with Serie A's A.C. Siena before joining Romanian club FC Naţional București.

In the winter of 2006, Stoica moved to Politehnica Timişoara, at the request of Gheorghe Hagi, the team's manager. After a good debut, he decided to part ways with "Poli Timisoara" and returned to Belgium in the following summer, starting the season with K.A.A. Gent.

In Stoica's first game for Gent, against Charleroi, a superb back heel pass from him resulted in the 2–1 winning goal. After the departure of manager Georges Leekens, Stoica was not happy with the time given by the his new coach Trond Sollied, with whom he had worked before at Club Brugge. After one-and-a-half seasons for "De Buffalo's" he ended his contract and became a free agent.

On 31 January 2008, under the management of his former teammate Enzo Scifo Stoica signed a contract with R.E. Mouscron, which was terminated three months later.

In February of the following year, he returned to Romania, joining FC Brașov on a one-year deal.

Stoica moved to Serbia in 2009, signing for two years with Serbian club FK Vojvodina, but his contract was terminated after one year due to several injuries.

He had two further stints with ASU Politehnica from Romania in 2013 and Standaard Wetteren from Belgium in 2014.

In January 2015, he moved to Liga I club Concordia Chiajna before retiring from professional football.

International career
Stoica's debut for the Romania national team came on 18 March 1998, in a friendly with Israel.

Personal life
Stoica's father, Tudorel, was also a footballer and a midfielder. He is the most capped player in the history of Steaua Bucharest, helping them to win the 1986 European Cup and UEFA Super Cup 1986.

After retiring from football, Tudorel Stoica served as scout for Anderlecht, and subsequently settled in Belgium.

Honours
Steaua București
Divizia A: 1995–96
Romanian Cup: 1995–96

Anderlecht
Belgian League: 1999–00, 2000–01
Belgian League Cup: 2000–01
Belgian Supercup: 2000, 2001

Club Brugge
Belgian League: 2002–03
Belgian League Cup: 2003–04
Belgian Supercup: 2003, 2004

Individual
Belgian League: Young Football of the Year 2001

References

External links
 
 Club Brugge archives 
 
 

1979 births
Living people
Footballers from Bucharest
Romanian footballers
Association football midfielders
FC Steaua București players
FC Progresul București players
FC Politehnica Timișoara players
FC Brașov (1936) players
Belgian Pro League players
R.S.C. Anderlecht players
Club Brugge KV players
K.A.A. Gent players
Royal Excel Mouscron players
A.C.N. Siena 1904 players
Serbian SuperLiga players
FK Vojvodina players
CS Concordia Chiajna players
SSU Politehnica Timișoara players
FB Gulbene players
Liga I players
Romania international footballers
Romanian expatriate footballers
Expatriate footballers in Belgium
Expatriate footballers in Italy
Expatriate footballers in Serbia
Expatriate footballers in Latvia
Expatriate footballers in Oman
Romanian expatriate sportspeople in Belgium